is a town located in Naka District, Tokushima Prefecture, Japan.

Geography 
Naka is located in southern of Tokushima Prefecture on the island of Shikoku. It is situated on the banks of the Naka River. Parts of the town are within the borders of the Tsurugisan Quasi-National Park, including areas such as Konose Gorge and the Tsurugisan Super Forest Road. In addition, Ogama Falls and Daitodorono Falls are scenic spots.

Neighbouring municipalities 
Tokushima Prefecture
 Anan
 Mima
 Miyoshi
 Katsuura
 Kamikatsu
 Minami
 Mima
 Kaiyō
 Kamiyama
Kōchi Prefecture
 Aki
 Kami
 Umaji

Climate
Naka has a humid subtropical climate (Köppen climate classification Cfa) with hot summers and cool winters. Precipitation is high, but there is a pronounced difference between the wetter summers and drier winters.

Demographics
Per Japanese census data, the population of Naka in 2020 is 7,367 people. Naka has been conducting censuses since 1920.

History 
As with all of Tokushima Prefecture, the area of Naka was part of ancient Awa Province. During the Edo period, the area was part of the holdings of Tokushima Domain ruled by the Hachisuka clan from their seat at Tokushima Castle. The villages of Aioi (相生村) and Wajjiki (鷲敷村) were established within Naka District, Tokushima with the creation of the modern municipalities system on October 1, 1889. Wajiki was elevated town status on July 10, 1908 followed by Aioi on September 30, 1956. Naka was founded on March 1, 2005 from the merger of the towns of Aioi,  Wajiki, and Kaminaka and the villages of Kisawa and Kito, all from Naka District.

Government
Naka has a mayor-council form of government with a directly elected mayor and a unicameral town council of 14 members. Naka contributes one member to the Tokushima Prefectural Assembly. In terms of national politics, the town is part of Tokushima 1st district of the lower house of the Diet of Japan.

Economy
The economy of Naka is largely agricultural. Otsuka Pharmaceutical has a large facility in Naka.

Education
Naka has four public elementary schools and three public middle schools operated by the town government and one public high school operated by the Tokushima Prefectural Department of Education.

Transportation

Railway
Naka has no passenger railway service. Kuwano Station in neighboring Anan or Hiwasa Station in neighboring Minami, both on the JR Shikoku Mugi Line are the closest stations.

Highways

Local attractions
 Tsurugisan Quasi-National Park

Notable people from Naka
Taiki Nakago, baseball pitcher
Masatoshi Sanma, slalom canoer

References

External links 

Naka official website 

 
Towns in Tokushima Prefecture